Paloma Fair (Spanish: La verbena de la Paloma) is a 1935 Spanish musical film directed by Benito Perojo and starring Miguel Ligero, Roberto Rey and Raquel Rodrigo. It is an adaptation of the 1894 Zarzuela La verbena de la Paloma and it is part of the tradition of Operetta films which was at its height during the 1930s. The film was made by Spain's largest studio of the era CIFESA, and was one of the most popular films made during the Second Spanish Republic.

Cast
 Miguel Ligero as Don Hilarión  
 Roberto Rey as Julián  
 Raquel Rodrigo as Susana  
 Sélica Pérez Carpio as Señá Rita  
 Dolores Cortés as Tía Antonia  
 Charito Leonís as Casta  
 Rafael Calvo as El tabernero  
 Enrique Salvador as Don Sebastián  
 Carmen Guerra as La bailadora 
 Isabel de Miguel as Cantadora 
 Guillermo Linhoff as El novio  
 Luis Llaneza as El inspector 
 Alicia Palacios as La novia

References

Bibliography 
 D'Lugo, Marvin. Guide to the Cinema of Spain. Greenwood Publishing, 1997.

External links 

1935 films
Spanish historical musical films
1930s historical musical films
1930s Spanish-language films
Films directed by Benito Perojo
Operetta films
Films set in the 19th century
Films set in Spain
Spanish black-and-white films